Urarina is an isolated language spoken in Peru, specifically in the Loreto Region of Northwest Peru, by the Urarina people. There are around 3,000 speakers in Urarinas District (along the Chambira River).  It uses a Latin script. It is also known as Itucali, Simacu or Shimacu.

It has a canonical word order of object–verb–subject.

Classification
The classification of Urarina remains contentious: academics have placed the language in at least four different language families including Panoan, Tupian, Macro-Tucanoan, and Amerind. However, the proposed language families share few similarities with Urarina, meaning it is likely best described as either “unclassified” or as a language isolate. It is usually assumed that it is a language isolate given Urarina’s complete lack of lexical overlap with any languages surrounding Urarina territory.

Language contact
Jolkesky (2016) notes that there are lexical similarities with the Arawak, Leko, and Omurano language families due to contact.

Status
Urarina is currently spoken by the 2,000-3,000 members of the Urarina tribe, the majority of whom have retained the ability to speak the language. However, bilingualism and use of Spanish in everyday life is on the rise, as more and more Spanish-speaking mestizos have immigrated to the valley where the Urarina live. While there is a bilingual education system, most bilingual schools almost exclusively use Spanish, as the majority of the teachers do not speak Urarina.  The version of Urarina that is spoken by  younger generations has lost a substantial degree of grammatical complexity and vocabulary, as correlated to the loss of traditional cultural practices and beliefs. The language is considered potentially endangered.

Phonology
The following is the phonology of Urarina as described by Olawsky.

Consonants

Vowels

Orthography is only written where it differs from IPA

Grammar
Urarina has several rare grammatical characteristics. The language follows the OVS word order: of all the languages that use OVS word order, Urarina is among the strictest adherents to this word order in speech. Another feature of Urarina is its complex system on all verbs (excluding borrowings). Every verb is marked according to one of three paradigms, as determined by a complicated set of pragmatic and syntactic conditions. 

Urarina follows a similarly unique word class system. Numerals and adjectives that are borrowed from Quechua and Spanish are placed in a completely separate class from indigenous Urarina words. Urarina also follows syntactic rules wherein the pitch-accent system changes the tone of a word, based on the preceding word class. The language's set of unique features has recently garnered special attention from linguists. However, Urarina's distinctive grammatical features are gradually disappearing as younger generations speak a Urarina that is being influenced by a growing bilingualism in Spanish

Like many other Amazonian languages, Urarina follows a polysynthetic, agglutinative word morphology in relating to verbs.

Vocabulary
Loukotka (1968) lists the following basic vocabulary items for Itucale.

{| class="wikitable sortable"
! gloss !! Itucale
|-
| one || exlehé
|-
| two || kuradzá
|-
| head || kuxterí
|-
| eye || idichú
|-
| woman || ení
|-
| fire || öxsí
|-
| sun || enotú
|-
| maize || kaxturí
|-
| house || luredí
|-
| white || dzumaré
|}

Flora and fauna
List of selected plant and animal names in Urarina:

References

Further reading

Olawsky, K. (2006). A Grammar of Urarina. (Mouton Grammar Library, 37). Berlin, New York: Mouton de Gruyter.
Wise, Mary Ruth. (1999). "Small Language Families and Isolates in Peru" in The Amazonian Languages. Dixon, R. M. W. and Aikhenvald, Alexandra (ed.)

Language isolates of South America
Object–verb–subject languages
Indigenous languages of Western Amazonia
Endangered language isolates